Bathuku Jataka Bandi is a 2013 talk show aired on Zee Telugu. The show focuses on providing psychological and legal counseling, aid, and guidance to disputing families and individuals. It is adapted from Tamil popular tv show Solvathellam Unmai by Lakshmy Ramakrishnan.

The first season of the show was hosted by film actress Sumalatha and directed by M V Prasanth Kumar & M Rahul, and was instrumental in reuniting more than 50 families. The second season of the show debuted on 6 July 2015 and was hosted by Jeevitha Rajashekar,
Roja Selvamani,Posani Krishna Murali, Geetha.

Adaptations

References

External links
 
Indian television talk shows
Zee Telugu original programming
Telugu-language television shows
Telugu-language television series based on Tamil-language television series